Gino Ciabatti (15 June 1883 – 14 April 1944) was an Italian rower. He competed in the men's single sculls event at the 1908 Summer Olympics.

References

1883 births
1944 deaths
Italian male rowers
Olympic rowers of Italy
Rowers at the 1908 Summer Olympics
Sportspeople from Pisa